Evelyn Rudie (born March 28, 1949) is an American playwright, director, songwriter, film and television actress, and teacher. Since 1973, she has been the co-artistic director of the Santa Monica Playhouse. As a costume designer, she uses the pseudonym Ashley Hayes.

Radio and television
Born in  Los Angeles, California, Rudie became an overnight star, in 1956, with her performance in the title role of the episode "Eloise" on television's Playhouse 90. It brought her critical acclaim, much press coverage, and an Emmy nomination at age six—the first time a child actress was so honored. She returned to Playhouse 90 the following year, portraying the young Perle Mesta in The Hostess with the Mostest.

The television "Eloise" was an adaptation of the popular book by Kay Thompson, which owed much to the delicate line illustrations of Hilary Knight. The marketing of "Eloise" and the subsequent book sequels practically always featured the illustrations of Knight, and numerous photographs were published in the 1950s of Rudie in the role. Her popularity as a child star led to the merchandising of at least one product which did not associate her with the character of Eloise, Evelyn Rudie Paper Dolls (Saalfield, 1958).

During the late 1950s, she also appeared on Alfred Hitchcock Presents, General Electric Theater, Lawman, The Red Skelton Show, and Wagon Train, along with seven appearances on The Tonight Show with Jack Paar. During this period, she also was an actress on radio programs, including Suspense.

Nine-year-old Evelyn Rudie appeared as a contestant on the October 29, 1959, episode of the TV quiz program You Bet Your Life, hosted by Groucho Marx. Rudie danced a waltz with her fellow contestant and told a joke in the German language. The pair earned $500.

After appearing uncredited in director George Sidney's Bye Bye Birdie (1963), she focused on education. She graduated from Hollywood High with honors and then studied film production at UCLA. Over a 36-year span, she has given more than 10,000 stage performances in 350 plays.

Rudie's star on the Hollywood Walk of Fame is located at the corner of Hollywood and Highland.

Select filmography

Films
Daddy Long Legs (uncredited, 1955)
The View from Pompey's Head (1955)
Hot Shots (1956)
Playhouse 90: Eloise (credited as "Eloise as Herself")
The Wings of Eagles (uncredited, 1957)
The Restless Breed (1957)
The Gift of Love (1958) 
Bye Bye Birdie (uncredited, 1963)

Television
  ""Alfred Hitchcock Presents""("A Man Most Beloved"; Season 02 Episode 33; 1957) as Hildegarde
  Wagon Train ("The Millie Davis Story"; 1958) as Penny
  G.E. Theater Episode "Nobody's Child" 1959, with Ronald Reagan and Diane Brewster
  77 Sunset Strip (1960) as Angel

Personal life
Rudie has been married to Chris DeCarlo since August 24, 1970. She was previously married to actor Tim O'Kelly.

References

External links

Eloise on TV
Santa Monica Playhouse: Evelyn Rudie

1949 births
Living people
American child actresses
American film actresses
American television actresses
People from Greater Los Angeles
21st-century American women